Jiang Zhe (Chinese: 蒋哲; Pinyin: Jiǎng Zhé, born 26 February 1989 in Dalian) is a Chinese football player who currently plays for Chinese Super League side Cangzhou Mighty Lions.

Club career
Jiang started his professional football career in 2006 when he was promoted to Harbin Yiteng's first team for the 2006 China League Two campaign. He made an impression within the team as Harbin Yiteng won promotion to the second tier at the end of the season by finishing second place of the league.

In July 2010, Jiang transferred to Chinese Super League side Changchun Yatai in a three-way trade with Dalian Shide that Dalian Shide sent Zou Jie to Dalian Yiteng and Changchun Yatai sent Yan Feng to Dalian Shide. He made his debut for Changchun on 28 July, in a 2–1 away defeat against Dalian Shide, coming on as a substitute for Lee Se-In in the 77th minute. On 18 May 2013, he scored his first Super League goal against Dalian Aerbin in the 89th minute, which ensured Changchun's 2–2 draw.

On 12 February 2019, Jiang transferred to fellow Super League side Chongqing Lifan.

Career statistics 
Statistics accurate as of match played 31 December 2021.

References

External links
 

Living people
1989 births
Footballers from Dalian
Chinese footballers
Changchun Yatai F.C. players
Zhejiang Yiteng F.C. players
Chongqing Liangjiang Athletic F.C. players
Chinese Super League players
China League One players
China League Two players
Association football midfielders